Yongshou County is a county under the administration of the prefecture-level city of Xianyang, in the central part of Shaanxi province, China.

Administrative divisions
As 2016, this County is divided to 11 towns.

Towns

Climate

Transport
China National Highway 312
Yongshou railway station on the Xi'an–Pingliang railway
Yongshou West railway station on the Yinchuan–Xi'an high-speed railway

References

County-level divisions of Shaanxi
Xianyang